The 1999 National Assembly for Wales election was held on Thursday 6 May 1999 to elect 60 members to the Senedd, at the time called the National Assembly for Wales (Welsh Parliament). It was the first devolved general election held in Wales after the successful 1997 Welsh devolution referendum. The election was held alongside the Scottish Parliament election (also the first of its kind) and English local elections.

Although Welsh Labour were the biggest party, they did not gain enough seats to form a majority government and instead entered into coalition with the Liberal Democrats. The election was marked by the historically high level of support for Plaid Cymru, who won their highest share of the vote in any Wales-wide election and remains their highest number of seats in a Senedd election to date. The party won considerable support in traditionally safe Labour areas such as the South Wales Valleys, winning Rhondda and Islwyn and narrowly failing to win a number of other seats.

The overall turnout of voters was 46.3%. This would remain the highest ever turnout for a devolved election in Wales until the 2021 Senedd election, which saw 46.6 of voters cast their ballot.

Election results
Overall turnout: 46.3%

|-
| style="background-color:white" colspan=15 | 
|-
!rowspan=3 colspan=2 | Parties
!colspan=10 | Additional member system
!rowspan=2 colspan=5 | Total seats
|-
!colspan=5 |Constituency
!colspan=5 |Region
|-
! Votes !! % !! +/− !! Seats !! +/− 
! Votes !! % !! +/− !! Seats !! +/−
! Total !! +/− !! %
|-

|-
|   || Total || 1,023,225 ||  ||  || 40 ||   || 1,019,987 ||  ||   || 20 ||  || 60 ||   ||
|}

Votes summary

Constituency and regional summary

Mid and West Wales 

|-
! colspan=2 style="width: 200px"|Constituency
! style="width: 150px"|Elected member
! style="width: 300px"|Result
 
 
 
 
 
 
 
 
 

|-
! colspan="2" style="width: 150px"|Party
! Elected candidates
! style="width: 40px"|Seats
! style="width: 40px"|+/−
! style="width: 50px"|Votes
! style="width: 40px"|%
! style="width: 40px"|+/−%
|-

North Wales 

|-
! colspan=2 style="width: 200px"|Constituency
! style="width: 150px"|Elected member
! style="width: 300px"|Result
 
 
 
 
 
 
 
 
 
 

|-
! colspan="2" style="width: 150px"|Party
! Elected candidates
! style="width: 40px"|Seats
! style="width: 40px"|+/−
! style="width: 50px"|Votes
! style="width: 40px"|%
! style="width: 40px"|+/−%
|-

South Wales Central 

|-
! colspan=2 style="width: 200px"|Constituency
! style="width: 150px"|Elected member
! style="width: 300px"|Result
 
 
 
 
 
 
 
 
 

|-
! colspan="2" style="width: 150px"|Party
! Elected candidates
! style="width: 40px"|Seats
! style="width: 40px"|+/−
! style="width: 50px"|Votes
! style="width: 40px"|%
! style="width: 40px"|+/−%
|-

South Wales East 

|-
! colspan=2 style="width: 200px"|Constituency
! style="width: 150px"|Elected member
! style="width: 300px"|Result
 
 
 
 
 
 
 
 
 

|-
! colspan="2" style="width: 150px"|Party
! Elected candidates
! style="width: 40px"|Seats
! style="width: 40px"|+/−
! style="width: 50px"|Votes
! style="width: 40px"|%
! style="width: 40px"|+/−%
|-

South Wales West 

|-
! colspan=2 style="width: 200px"|Constituency
! style="width: 150px"|Elected member
! style="width: 300px"|Result
 
 
 
 
 
 
 
 

|-
! colspan="2" style="width: 150px"|Party
! Elected candidates
! style="width: 40px"|Seats
! style="width: 40px"|+/−
! style="width: 50px"|Votes
! style="width: 40px"|%
! style="width: 40px"|+/−%
|-

Opinion polls

See also
 Senedd (formerly National Assembly for Wales)
 Senedd constituencies and electoral regions

References

External links
 1999 Welsh National Assembly Election at BBC News

Manifestos
 Welsh Labour
 Welsh Liberal Democrats
 Plaid Cymru

1999
National Assembly for Wales
National Assembly election
1990s elections in Wales
National Assembly for Wales election